YCO may refer to:

 YCO - the IATA code for Kugluktuk Airport.
 YCO - a Youth Crime Officer who is part of the Youth Offending Team in a department of a police force in the United Kingdom.